Billabong High International School, Noida is a CBSE school located on a seven-acre campus in Sector 34, Noida, India. It was founded by the G D Education Society.

The school also has a kindergarten called Kangaroo Kids Noida. With 1131 students and 72 teachers, this CBSE affiliated school has a Teacher Student ratio of 15.7.

It also has an ERP access

Teachers 
This dimension relates to the quality of teaching, use of learning aids and support provided by teachers to students. Parents can compare community sentiments about teachers and qualification of teachers with the average measures in the school’s local area.

External links

 http://www.billabongnoida.com
http://school-erp.three60.in

International schools in India
Primary schools in Uttar Pradesh
High schools and secondary schools in Uttar Pradesh
Schools in Noida
Educational institutions in India with year of establishment missing